Richard Taylor Bellhouse (9 May 1825 – 7 December 1906) was an English first-class cricketer, watercolourist and architect.

Bellhouse was born at Manchester. He made his debut in first-class cricket for Manchester against Sheffield at Sheffield. He played in first-class matches for Manchester against Sheffield on ten occasions between 1846 and 1854, including on three occasions when the matches were billed as Lancashire v Yorkshire in 1849 and 1851. He appeared in a first-class match for the Gentlemen of England against the Gentlemen of the Marylebone Cricket Club at Lord's in 1853, as well as appearing in two North v South for the North in 1855 and 1856. He played for Manchester against Sussex in 1858, before making a final first-class appearance for Gentlemen of the North against the Gentlemen of the South at The Oval in 1859. Across fifteen first-class matches, Bellhouse scored 240 runs at an average of 8.57, with a high score of 40.

Outside of cricket he worked as an architect and a watercolour artist. He was responsible for designing the grandstand at Knutsford Racecourse. He died at Weston in Bath in December 1906, where he was buried at Locksbrook Weston Cemetery. His brother, Thomas Bellhouse, also played first-class cricket.

References

External links

1825 births
1906 deaths
Cricketers from Manchester
English cricketers
Manchester Cricket Club cricketers
Lancashire cricketers
Gentlemen of England cricketers
North v South cricketers
Gentlemen of the North cricketers
English watercolourists
Architects from Manchester